Kangaroo Island most commonly refers to Kangaroo Island in South Australia.

Other islands called Kangaroo Island

In Queensland
Kangaroo Island (Queensland), in Queensland

In Tasmania
Kangaroo Island (Tasmania), in North West Tasmania, in Bass Strait
East Kangaroo Island, in North East Tasmania, in Bass Strait

In Western Australia
Kangaroo Island (Shark Bay), one of the islands in the Shark Bay World Heritage Reserve in Western Australia

See also